Not Shy is the third extended play by South Korean girl group Itzy. It was released on August 17, 2020, by JYP Entertainment. It is available in three versions and contains six tracks, including the lead single of the same name. The EP marks a growth in music production and collaboration as they tap known hitmakers such as SM Entertainment songwriter Kenzie and producers LDN Noise. Musically, Not Shy is a K-pop record that contains influences of pop rock and hip hop.

The album received positive reviews from critics, who commended Itzy's departure from themes of independence and self-love to the theme of love. Upon its release, Not Shy debuted at the top spot of the Gaon Albums Chart and went on to sell almost 206,280 copies on its first month of release in South Korea. The album also charted in Japan, Poland and the United States, peaking at number 8 on the Billboard World Albums chart.

On December 25, 2020, Itzy revealed the tracklist for their English debut extended play Not Shy (English Ver.). It was released on January 22, 2021, and includes English versions of their title tracks "Dalla Dalla", "Icy", "Wannabe" and "Not Shy". A Japanese-language version of "Not Shy" was included on Itzy's first compilation album It'z Itzy, which was released on December 22, 2021. The Japanese lyrics were written by Yohei.

Background and release

On June 22, 2020, it was reported that Itzy is preparing for a comeback at the end of July. On July 31, Itzy had dropped a preview of the physical album for “Not Shy”. On August 3 Itzy has shared their first group teaser image. On August 10, the group has unveiled the track list for the mini album “Not Shy”. The music video teaser was released on August 12. The highlight medley was released on August 16. The EP was released on August 17, 2020, through several music portals including iTunes and Spotify.

Music and composition
The album zeroes in on the K-pop quintet's teenage years under the limelight while shouting out their loyal fans who've stood by them. Musically, Not Shy is a K-pop record that contains influences of pop-rock and hip-hop. The EP also marks a growth in music production and collaboration as they tap known K-pop hitmakers such as SM Entertainment songwriter Kenzie and producers LDN Noise.

The title track blends braggadocious hip-hop and pop production. The second track "Don't Give A What", is a fun pop-rock song that has a catchy hook. The song marks as a natural progression in this feminist theme. "SURF" is a song with a funky bassline. "ID" marks a chord progression for Itzy. "Be in Love" is Itzy's first slower vocally-focused song with a guitar melody.

Promotion

Singles
Not Shy was released as the lead single from the album on August 17, 2020. Itzy became one of the only two girl groups (the other being Blackpink), to appear on both the Billboard Global 200 and the Billboard Global Excl. US Charts, peaking at number 124 and 70 respectively. "Not Shy" also reached the top-ten in South Korea, Singapore and Malaysia. The song went on to win a total of 5 music show wins - 1 on Show Champion and Music Bank, and 3 on MCountdown, briefly tying Itzy with Blackpink for the most wins by a girl group in 2020 with 13 accumulative wins.

Critical reception

Heran Mamo of Billboard was positive in her review saying "Featuring six songs, Not Shy zeroes in on the K-pop quintet's teenage years under the limelight while shouting out their loyal fans who've stood by them. ITZY kicked off today's Not Shy release by also showing off the visual for the titular track, which proves the girls are not shy whatsoever". He also wrote that the song "blends braggadocious hip-hop and pop production". Popcrush's Lai Frances considered the album marks a growth in music production and collaboration. She also appreciated their themes of independence and self-love have morphed into a coming-of-age glow-up, with the group tipping their toes into the waters of singing about love.

IZM writer Seonhee Lim opined "that the song was heavily armed with sound that filled the gap, as if it contained the spirit of a young composer. The saxophone's funky rhythm dominates the whole song, and the composition that changes sharply shifts the center of gravity, adding a three-dimensional effect to the music. Overall, it is a melody that flows with power. Particularly, the part that goes from the free chorus to the chorus is smooth and plays a sufficient role to raise the expectation. The members' vocals, which are more natural than before, also play a part. However, she criticized certain factors that hinder this catharsis. The chorus 'ITZY~', which appears in the middle of the chorus, seems to be aimed at addiction, but rather, it only brings embarrassment. It feels like a forcefully fitted. In addition, EDM sounds such as'Turn down for what' and'GDFR', which were popular in the early 2010s, passed by, bringing the point of getting tired more and more in the second half".

Commercial performance

South Korea
Not Shy debuted at number one on the  Gaon Weekly Album Chart with 206,280 album-equivalent units, marking their largest monthly sales and streaming figures.  It is Itzy's third number-one album in the country; they also became the first female artist in 2020 to more than have two number one extended plays. In its second week on the Gaon Weekly Album Chart, Not Shy fell off the chart. In its third week, it rose to number nine. The title track peaked at number nine, becoming the group's fourth top ten single.

Other markets
In Poland, the EP debuted and peaked at number 23, marking their highest ever appearance on a European chart. In the US, Not Shy peaked at number 8 on the US Billboard World Albums chart, but did not make an impact on the Billboard Heatseekers Albums.

Track listing

Charts

Certifications and sales

Release history

See also
 List of Gaon Album Chart number ones of 2020
 List of K-pop songs on the Billboard charts
 List of K-pop albums on the Billboard charts
 List of M Countdown Chart winners (2020)

References

2020 EPs
Itzy EPs
Korean-language EPs
JYP Entertainment EPs